Irgenhausen is a village (Aussenwacht) of the municipality of Pfäffikon in the canton of Zurich in Switzerland.

Geography
Irgenhausen is located in the district of Pfäffikon in the Zürcher Oberland on the eastern shore of the Pfäffikersee (Lake Pfäffikon).

Demographics
Irgenhausen belongs politically to the municipality of Pfäffikon.

History

In Roman era, along Pfäffikersee there was a Roman road from the vicus Centum Prata (Kempraten) on Obersee–Lake Zürich via Vitudurum (Oberwinterthur) to Tasgetium (Eschenz) to the Rhine. To secure this important transport route, the Irgenhausen Castrum was built. The native name of the fort is unknown, thus Irgenhausen was mentioned in 811 AD as Camputuna sive Irincheshusa. Maybe the castrum's name was Cambodunum, the name of the neighboring village of Kempten.

Points of interest 
The Roman Irgenhausen Castrumis located in Irgenhausen on the shore of Pfäffikersee.

Notable people 
 Jakob Heusser (1862–1941), Swiss industrialist

References

External links

 Official website of the municipality of Pfäffikon (ZH) 
 

Villages in the canton of Zürich
Pfäffikon, Zürich
Pfäffikersee